53rd CAS Awards
February 18, 2017

Motion Picture – Live Action: 
La La Land

Motion Picture – Animated: 
Finding Dory

The 53rd Cinema Audio Society Awards were held on February 18, 2017, in the Bunker Hill Ballroom of the OMNI Los Angeles Hotel at California Plaza, Los Angeles, honoring outstanding achievements in sound mixing in film and television of 2016.



Winners and nominees

References

2016 film awards
2016 television awards
Cinema Audio Society Awards
2016 in American cinema
2016 guild awards